Tim Dettmann (born 10 May 1982) is a German badminton player. At the 2006/07 European Circuit, he won the Bulgarian and Finnish International tournaments and became the runner-up at the Poland in the mixed doubles event. He also the runner-up at the Turkey, Finnish, and Polish International tournaments in the men's doubles event. In 2011, he became the runner-up at the Estonian International tournament in the mixed doubles event partnered with Ilse Vaessen of Netherlands.

Achievements

BWF International Challenge/Series 
Men's doubles

Mixed doubles

  BWF International Challenge tournament
  BWF International Series tournament

References

External links 
 

1982 births
Living people
Sportspeople from Berlin
German male badminton players